Murray County Courthouse may refer to:

Murray County Courthouse (Georgia), Chatsworth, Georgia
Murray County Courthouse (Oklahoma), Sulphur, Oklahoma